John Peter Rillie (born 4 November 1971) is an Australian basketball coach and former player. He currently serves as head coach of the Perth Wildcats of the National Basketball League (NBL). He played 16 seasons in the NBL between 1995 and 2010 before embarking on a coaching career in the United States' college system.

Early life
Rillie was born in Toowoomba, Queensland. Growing up in Toowoomba, he played basketball, cricket and Australian rules football. He attended Harristown State High School.

College career
Rillie moved to the United States in 1991 to play college basketball for Tacoma Community College. In 1992, he transferred to Gonzaga, where he played the next three years. During his three seasons with the Bulldogs, he helped lead the team to the 1994 National Invitation Tournament and the school's first berth in the NCAA tournament in 1995.

Professional career
After graduating college, Rillie returned to Australia and debuted in the National Basketball League (NBL) during the 1995 season with the Brisbane Bullets, where he won NBL Rookie of the Year. He joined the Adelaide 36ers in 1996 and played three seasons for them, winning a championship in 1998.

For the 1998–99 NBL season, Rillie joined the West Sydney Razorbacks. During the 1999 and 2000 off-seasons, he played for the Penrith Panthers in the SEABL.

After four seasons with the Razorbacks and a grand final appearance in 2001–02, Rillie moved to Greece for the 2002–03 season to play for AEK Athens. He returned to Australia in December 2002 and re-joined the Razorbacks. On 1 March 2003, he scored 45 points and made eleven 3-pointers in a 113–102 win over the Canberra Cannons. His 23.6 points per game during the 2002–03 NBL season earned him the scoring title. He had another 45-point game during the semi-finals of the 2003–04 NBL season. That season, he was named All-NBL First Team and helped the Razorbacks reach the grand final. He was subsequently granted a release from the final year of his contract with West Sydney.

In June 2004, Rillie signed with the Townsville Crocodiles. On 18 February 2009, he scored 34 points and made ten 3-pointers in the Crocodiles' 103–96 win over the Perth Wildcats in the elimination final.

His final season in the NBL came in 2009–10 with the New Zealand Breakers. He was limited to 12 games.

In 481 NBL games, Rillie averaged 16.3 points, 5.8 rebounds, 3.7 assists and 1.1 steals per game.

National team career
From 1997 to 2004, Rillie was a member of the Australian Boomers. He represented Australia at the 2004 Athens Olympics.

Coaching career
In 2010, Rillie returned to the United States and during the 2010–11 season, he served as the director of basketball operations for the Boise State Broncos.

In 2011, Rillie was appointed an assistant coach of the Broncos, a position he held for six seasons. In 2017, he was hired as an assistant coach for the UC Santa Barbara Gauchos. After his first season with the Gauchos, he was promoted to associate head coach. The 2021–22 season was his fifth with the Gauchos and fourth as associate head coach.

Rillie was an assistant coach for the Australian Boomers at the Tokyo Olympics in July and August 2021, helping guide the Boomers to the bronze medal.

On 11 July 2022, Rillie was appointed head coach of the Perth Wildcats of the NBL on a three-year contract.

Personal life
Rillie and his wife Heidi have three children. Heidi is American but holds dual Australian citizenship. Their children were all born in Australia.

References

External links
 NBL player profile
 UC Santa Barbara Gauchos coach profile
 Boise State Broncos coach profile
 Sports-Reference.com profile
 "Q & A: Boise State's John Rillie" at nbl.com.au

1971 births
Living people
AEK B.C. players
Adelaide 36ers players
Australian men's basketball players
Australian expatriate basketball people in the United States
Australian expatriate basketball people in Greece
Australian expatriate sportspeople in New Zealand
Basketball players at the 2004 Summer Olympics
Boise State Broncos men's basketball coaches
Brisbane Bullets players
Gonzaga Bulldogs men's basketball players
Junior college men's basketball players in the United States
New Zealand Breakers players
Olympic basketball players of Australia
Perth Wildcats coaches
Sportspeople from Toowoomba
Shooting guards
Townsville Crocodiles players
UC Santa Barbara Gauchos men's basketball coaches
West Sydney Razorbacks players